Risas amargas (English: Goodbye, my love) is a Mexican telenovela produced by Televisa and broadcast by Telesistema Mexicano in 1962.

Cast 
Amparo Rivelles - Juana
José Gálvez - Gabriel
Rosa Elena Durgel - Paulina
Ramón Bugarini - Rolando
Rosa Cué - María
Rosa Elena Durgel - Paulina

References

External links 

Mexican telenovelas
1962 telenovelas
Televisa telenovelas
1962 Mexican television series debuts
1962 Mexican television series endings
Spanish-language telenovelas